Mississauga Eagles may refer to:

Mississauga Eagles P.S.C., a Canadian soccer team that played in the Canadian Professional Soccer League in 1998
Mississauga Eagles FC, a Canadian soccer team that played in the Canadian Soccer League in 2011 and 2012

Disambig-Class Canada-related articles
Disambig-Class football articles